VNU University of Science (VNU-HUS) is a member of Vietnam National University, Hanoi. Founded in 1906 as Indochina University, the university has changed its name three times: School of Basic Science (1951), University of Hanoi (1956), VNU University of Science (1993). Since the last name change, VNU University of Science is a member of Vietnam National University, Hanoi.

History 
- 1904: Đông Dương University.

- 1946: University of Science.

- 1956: Hanoi University, established under Decision No. 2183 / CP of June 4, 1956 of the Prime Minister. At the beginning, the university had three specialized faculties: Math - Physics, Chemistry - Literature, Literature - History.

- In 1993: Hanoi National University was established under Decree No. 97 / CP of December 10, 1993 of the Prime Minister on the basis of merging three universities: Hanoi University, Hanoi University of Pedagogy. Internal and University of Foreign Language Education.

- 1995: From September 1995, the University of Natural Sciences officially came into operation as a member university of VNU.

- 1999: Faculty of Information Technology, Faculty of Electronics and Telecommunication Technology, Information Technology Training Institute (now known as Institute of Electronics and Informatics) was separated from University of Science and Technology to reorganize into Faculty of Technology Online VNU. The Research Center for Applied Microbiology and Research Center for Edible Mushrooms has also been reorganized into a Biotechnology Center under VNU. Research center for environmental resources under the Department of Biology was also divided into a unit under VNU.

The school currently has 3 campuses in Hanoi capital, of which the main campus is located at 334 Nguyen Trai, Thanh Xuan, Hanoi. Two other campuses at 19 Le Thanh Tong, Hoan Kiem, Hanoi and 182 Luong The Vinh, Thanh Xuan, Hanoi. In particular, the 19 Le Thanh Tong campus is the basis of the University of Indochina established in 1906, a valuable architectural heritage designed by famous French architect Ernest Hébrard, built from the French time. belonging, neoclassical French architectural style. This complex is a cultural monument with important historical value and a valuable architectural value of a school in the rare architectural treasure of the late 19th and early 20th centuries in Vietnam.

Currently, VNU University of Science has 11 Divisions / Departments / Centers of the Administration Division, 08 Faculties (Math - Mechanical - Informatics, Physics, Chemistry, Biology, Geology, Geography, Meteorology - Hydrology - Hai Oceanology, Environment), 01 Natural Science High School, 07 research centers, 01 key state-level laboratories, 05 key VNU-level laboratories and 01 University-affiliated limited company.

The university has 100 laboratories (laboratories) and computer labs for teaching, learning and scientific research. In which, there are 85 laboratories, one national key laboratory, five key laboratories at VNU and four groups: Basic Practice Laboratory, Thematic Laboratory, Target Laboratory and Key Laboratory. Some laboratories are equipped with modern machinery, similar to the modern laboratories of the region and the world.

210341021119

 http://hus.vnu.edu.vn/hus/en/main/greetings-0

Educational institutions established in 1904
Vietnam National University, Hanoi
1904 establishments in French Indochina